Matthieu Ligoule (born 6 March 1983) is a French former professional footballer who played as a defensive midfielder. He played in Ligue 2 with US Orléans and Libourne-Saint-Seurin.

Ligoule's twin brother Sébastien is also a footballer, but has never played at a professional level.

Career statistics

Honours
Orléans
 Championnat National: 2013–14

References

External links
 
 Matthieu Ligoule at foot-national.com
 

1983 births
Living people
Footballers from Bordeaux
French footballers
Association football midfielders
FC Libourne players
US Orléans players
Championnat National 2 players
Championnat National players
Ligue 2 players
Twin sportspeople
French twins